Of Faith, Power and Glory is the seventh studio album the German-based alternative electronic band VNV Nation, released on 19 June 2009. As quoted by VNV Nation, it is "soulful and anthemic but yet raw and uncompromising at some points"

It spent two weeks in the mainstream German Media Control charts, peaking at No. 41, and appeared on several Billboard charts in the US.

Track listing

Charts

Notes
-The track Art of Conflict has lyrics from the Art of War by Sun Tzu.

References

2009 albums
VNV Nation albums